Oliver Ross (born 10 October 2004) is a Danish professional footballer who plays as a forward for Danish Superliga club AaB. He is the younger brother of Mathias Ross.

Career

AaB
Oliver Ross, like his older brother Mathias Ross, came to AaB from partner club Aalborg KFUM. He worked his way up through the youth ranks and made his debut for the first team in a Danish Cup game against FIUK on 31 August 2021, scoring two goals in a 13-0 victory. Later in that season, on 20 March 2022, he got his Danish Superliga debut against Brøndby IF. Ross also played in 10 of the last 11 games of the season for AaB.

On 22 June 2022, Ross signed a new deal with AaB until June 2025 and was permanently promoted to the first team squad. In August 2022, it was rumoured that Italian giants A.C. Milan had bid for Ross. But AaB's price tag probably meant that the deal never came off and Ross therefore stayed at AaB.

References

External links

Oliver Ross at DBU

2004 births
Living people
Danish men's footballers
Association football forwards
Denmark youth international footballers
Danish Superliga players
AaB Fodbold players